Upton Hellions is a village in Devon, England, located north of Long Barn and south of East Village, and near to Crediton.

External links

Villages in Devon